Freedom Act may refer to:

 Energy Independence and Security Act of 2007, which included the FREEDOM Act
 USA Freedom Act, a 2014 bill in the United States Congress